Earl Robert Putnam (January 10, 1932 – February 19, 2006) was an American football center who played college football for Arizona State and professional football in the National Football League (NFL) for the Chicago Cardinals during the 1957 season. He appeared in a total of 12 NFL games, all of them as a starter.

Early years
Putnam was born in 1932 in Cincinnati and attended Hughes High School in that city. He then played college football at Arizona State.

Professional football
He was drafted by the New York Giants with the 52nd overall pick in the 1954 NFL Draft. He served in the Army and played for the Fort Ord football team in 1953. He was the biggest man ever signed by the Giants at the time, and the biggest man in professional football in 1955, at 6 feet, 6 inches, and 310 pounds, but did not appear in any regular season games for the Giants. He signed with the Hamilton Tiger-Cats of the Canadian Football League (CFL) and appeared in one game for Hamilton in 1956.  He then signed with the Chicago Cardinals and started 12 games during the 1957 season.

Later years
Putnam died in 2006 at age 74.

References

1932 births
2006 deaths
American football centers
Chicago Cardinals players
Arizona State Sun Devils football players
Players of American football from Cincinnati